The Tombs is a restaurant and bar located in the Georgetown neighborhood of Washington, D.C. It was opened on July 23, 1962, by restauranteur and Georgetown University graduate Richard McCooey as the below ground bar or rathskeller  for his restaurant 1789. The Tombs is a popular destination for Georgetown University students and alumni, and has been ranked as one of the best college bars in America. It is well known for its collegiate rowing-themed interior design, as well as the 99 days club, a competition in which Georgetown senior aim to eat or drink at the club for all of the final three and a half months of the school year. In 1962, McCooey established the tradition of regular “Chimes Nights” where Georgetown's all-male a capella group, the Georgetown Chimes, would perform in the pub, inspired by the Whiffenpoofs’ weekly performances at Yale local establishment Mory's. The Chimes Night tradition continues to this day. The restaurant was named after a fictional establishment mentioned in the poem "Bustopher Jones: The Cat About Town" by T.S. Eliot.

The Tombs was purchased by Clyde's Restaurant Group in 1985.

References

External links

1962 establishments in Washington, D.C.
Drinking establishments in Washington, D.C.
Restaurants in Washington, D.C.
Restaurants established in 1962